Radhanagari Vidhan Sabha seat is one of the 288 Vidhan Sabha (legislative assembly) constituencies of Maharashtra state in western India.

Overview
Radhanagari (constituency number 272) is one of the ten Vidhan Sabha constituencies located in the Kolhapur district. This constituency covers the entire Radhanagari tehsil and parts of Ajra and Bhudargad tehsils of this district.

Radhanagari is part of the Kolhapur Lok Sabha constituency along with five other Vidhan Sabha segments in this district, namely Chandgad, Kagal, Kolhapur South, Karvir and Kolhapur North.

Members of Legislative Assembly
 1980: Haribhau kadav, Indian National Congress (I)
 1985: Bajarang Desai, Indian Congress (Socialist)
 1990: Shankar Patil, Janata Dal
 1995: Namdevrao Bhoite, Independent
 1999: Bajarang Desai, Indian National Congress
 2004: Krishnarao Patil, Independent
 2009: Krishnarao Patil, Nationalist Congress Party
 2014: Prakash Abitkar, shivsena 
 2019: Prakash Abitkar, shivsena

See also
 Radhanagari
 Kolhapur District 
 List of constituencies of Maharashtra Vidhan Sabha

References

Assembly constituencies of Maharashtra